Lošinj Airport  is a privately owned public airport 3.2 nautical miles (5.9 km) from Mali Lošinj on the island of Lošinj, Croatia. It is registered for domestic and international traffic.

Overview
The runway is 900 m long and 30 m wide, and is equipped with 1C signalization according to the ICAO. A non-precision instrument approach using an NDB located near the city is published. The runway and taxiways are paved with asphalt. Two taxiways are positioned at 45° from the runway.

The traffic consists primarily of small aircraft.  It was built in 1985 when Croatia was still part of Yugoslavia and it was built as a general aviation airport for the air sports.

Airlines and destinations

As of February 2021, there are no regular flights scheduled and the airport. The sole remaining seasonal route by Silver Air to Lugano is not scheduled for resumption in the wake of the COVID-19 pandemic.

Statistics

References

External links
 Official website

Airports in Croatia
Lošinj
Buildings and structures in Primorje-Gorski Kotar County
Transport in Primorje-Gorski Kotar County